Château-Gontier is a former commune in the Mayenne department in north-western France. On 1 January 2019, it was merged into the new commune Château-Gontier-sur-Mayenne.

Geography 
Château-Gontier is home to the Refuge de l'Arche, also known as the Ark Refuge , a refuge for abandoned or mistreated animals.

History 
There are chalybeate springs close to the town. Château-Gontier owes its origin and its name to a castle erected in the first half of the 11th century by Gunther, the steward of Fulk Nerra of Anjou, on the site of a farm belonging to the monks of St Aubin d’Angers. On the extinction of the family, the lordship was assigned by Louis XI of France to Philippe de Comines. The town suffered severely during the wars of the League. In 1793 it was occupied by the Vendeans.

Culture and heritage 

The following buildings have been listed as historical monuments:
The ruined 13th century castle
The 11th century church of Saint John Baptist
The church of the Holy Trinity
The 12th century chapel of Le Genneteil
The 16th century chapel of Le Moulinet
The 17th century Hôtel de Lantivy

People 
 Conan II, Duke of Brittany was found dead here during the Breton Norman Wars, likely the victim of poisoning. 
 Claude Pompidou was born here.
 General Emile-René Lemonnier was born and buried here.
 Louis-François Allard (1735-1819), physician and politician.
 Guy de Charnacé (1825–1909), agronomist, writer, musicologist was born here.
 Alexis Roger, French composer (1814–1846), was born here.
 Olivier Peslier, French horse racing jockey was born here.

See also

Communes of the Mayenne department

References

Former communes of Mayenne
Anjou
States and territories disestablished in 2019
Populated places disestablished in 2019